is an English land law case, concerning constructive trusts, and the establishment of a beneficial interest in an enterprise between a business owner and his or her lover and co-worker.  It specifically concerned a case where the latter person received no formal wages and had entered no formal ownership nor partnership agreement nor directly or indirectly contributed in money to the purchase price.

Facts
Mrs Geary and Mr Rankine had been in a relationship since 1990. In 1996, Rankine purchased a guest house with his own savings. The parties had not intended to live in the property or run it themselves; instead having it run by a manager. Difficulties with the manager led Rankine to run the business himself. He realised that he could not run it alone. Geary became involved in the business: cleaning, cooking and looking after guests. Rankine did not pay Geary wages, and she asked for money when she needed it. The relationship deteriorated. Geary brought a claim for an interest in the guest house.  She claimed she either had a business Partnership (as defined under the Partnership Act 1890) or a constructive trust as defined by case law.

Judgment
At first instance, the Judge rejected Geary's claim. She appealed.

The Court of Appeal dismissed the appeal, holding that the legal title was solely in Rankine's name and so the burden of establishing a constructive trust was on Geary. The relevant question was whether there was a common intention for Geary to have a beneficial interest in the property, applying Jones v Kernott [2011] UKSC 53, which must be determined objectively from the parties' conduct. Geary had shown there was a common intention to run the business together, but it was not correct to therefore reach a conclusion of a common intention that the property in which the business was run, bought by only one of them, would if so belong to both of them. The judge at first instance had not erred in probing the evidence and concluding there was no constructive trust.

Lewison 's summative paragraph reads:

See also

Jones v Kernott [2011] UKSC 53
Oxley v Hiscock [2004] EWCA Civ 546
Stack v Dowden [2007] UKHL 17

Notes

2012 in case law
2012 in British law
English land case law
Court of Appeal (England and Wales) cases